The Wrestling competition in the 1973 Summer Universiade were held in Moscow, Soviet Union. It was added as an optional sports by the host country, Soviet Union.

Medal table

Medal summary

Freestyle

Greco-Roman

References

1973 Summer Universiade
1981
Universiade
Universiade